is the Japanese word for the land of the dead (World of Darkness). According to Shinto mythology as related in Kojiki, this is where the dead go in the afterlife. Once one has eaten at the hearth of Yomi it is (mostly) impossible to return to the land of the living. Yomi in Japanese mythology is comparable to Hades or Sheol and is most commonly known for Izanami's retreat to that place after her death. Izanagi followed her there and upon his return he washed himself, creating Amaterasu, Susanoo, and Tsukuyomi-no-Mikoto in the process.

This realm of the dead seems to have geographical continuity with this world and certainly cannot be thought of as a paradise to which one would aspire, nor can it appropriately be described as a hell in which one suffers retribution for past deeds; rather, all deceased carry on a gloomy and shadowy existence in perpetuity, regardless of their behavior in life. Many scholars believe that the image of Yomi was derived from ancient Japanese tombs in which corpses were left for some time to decompose.

The kanji that are sometimes used to transcribe Yomi actually refer to the mythological Chinese realm of the dead called Diyu or Huángquán (lit. "Yellow Springs"), which appears in Chinese texts as early as the eighth century BCE. This dark and vaguely defined realm was believed to be located beneath the earth, but it was not until the Han dynasty that the Chinese had a clearly articulated conception of an underworld below in contrast with a heavenly realm above. The characters are jukujikun, i.e. were used without regard to the actual meaning of the word Yomi, which is unknown.

Yomi is ruled over by Izanami no Mikoto, the Grand Deity of Yomi (Yomo-tsu-Ōkami ). According to Kojiki, the entrance to Yomi lies in Izumo province and was sealed off by Izanagi upon his flight from Yomi, at which time he permanently blocked the entrance by placing a massive boulder (Chigaeshi no ōkami ) at the base of the slope that leads to Yomi (Yomotsu Hirasaka  or ). Upon his return to Ashihara-no-Nakatsukuni, Izanagi noted that Yomi is a "polluted land" (kegareki kuni). This opinion reflects the traditional Shinto association between death and pollution. Later Susanoo takes this position over.

Christian uses
Some Japanese Christian texts use  to refer to what is called Hell in the English versions, which corrupted the original meaning. For example,

Sometime  means Hades or Sheol, whereas  means Gehenna.

See also
 Yomotsu Hirasaka

References

Bibliography 

 

Afterlife places
Locations in Japanese mythology
Underworld
Mythological places